Shone is the major town of Badawacho, Hadiya Zone, Southern Ethiopia. The major landmarks are St Georgis Orthodox Church and the Shone Health Centre. The town was the constituency which in the May 2000 elections elected Beyene Petros, leader of the SEPDU, and chairman of the opposition CAFPDE.

References

Populated places in the Southern Nations, Nationalities, and Peoples' Region